Naseer Akram (born 12 April 1984) is a Pakistani first-class cricketer who plays for Water and Power Development Authority.

References

External links
 

1984 births
Living people
Pakistani cricketers
Water and Power Development Authority cricketers
Cricketers from Faisalabad